The Mil-PRF-32171 is a new US military specification with requirements for high-durability, wear-resistant deck coatings. Specifically they for use in high-traffic areas, and are to require minimal maintenance.  The coatings can be either high gloss (Class 2) or semi gloss (Class 1). Being approved by all Department and Agencies within the Department of Defense (DOD) this specification has strict specifications for 2-part chemical component systems. 1-part component systems that require no mixing allow for the material to be quickly applied while adhering to the government specifications. The specification further encourages the use of recycled materials in the coatings to make them more economically friendly.

References

Military of the United States standards